Maciej Kurowski (born 19 June 1986 in Jelenia Góra) is a Polish luger who has competed since 2005. His best finish at the FIL World Luge Championships was 29th in the men's singles event at Lake Placid, New York in 2009.

Kurowski finished 21st in the men's singles event at the FIL European Luge Championships 2010 in Sigulda.

He qualified for the 2010 Winter Olympics where he finished 23rd in the men's singles event.

References
 FIL-Luge profile

External links
 
 
 

1986 births
Living people
Polish male lugers
Olympic lugers of Poland
Lugers at the 2010 Winter Olympics
Lugers at the 2014 Winter Olympics
Lugers at the 2018 Winter Olympics
People from Jelenia Góra
Sportspeople from Lower Silesian Voivodeship